The 2019–20 Football League Greece was the first season as a third-tier professional league of the Greek football league system since its restructuring and the ninth season under the name Football League after previously being known as Beta Ethniki. This year the participating teams were reduced from 16 to 14. On 2 June 2020, the season was officially ended due to the COVID-19 pandemic with Trikala announced as champions.

Teams

 Niki Volos and Kalamata were accepted to play in the Football League by decision of the HFF, taking the place of Iraklis and Nestos Chrysoupoli, who withdrew its participation.

 Trikala placed 12th in the 2018–19 Football League, thus becoming ineligible to play in the Super League 2, the country's newly founded Second Division.

Personnel and sponsoring

League table

Results

Top scorers

References

3
Third level Greek football league seasons
Greece
Greece 3